Ficus sarmentosa (Nepali language:Ban Timila) is a fig tree with edible fruit. F. sarmentosa is native to China, Eastern Asia, Indian Subcontinent and Indo-China region. Some of its habitats include forests, scrub, and mountains.

References

sarmentosa
Trees of China
Trees of the Indian subcontinent
Trees of Myanmar
Trees of Vietnam
Fodder